Morehead Township is  a rural, non-functioning county subdivision established in 1868 in Guilford County, North Carolina, United States.. The population at the 2010 census was 195,218.

History
Morehead Township was created as an administrative division of Guilford County in 1868, as required by the North Carolina Constitution as re-written in 1868.

Other facts

 Metro Area: Greensboro Area
 ZIP Codes: 27235, 27265, 27282, 27358, 27401, 27403, 27405, 27406, 27407, 27408, 27409, 27410, 27455
 Unified School District: Guilford County
 Congressional Districts: NC-6, NC-12
 State Senate Districts: NC-26, NC-27, NC-28
 State House Districts: NC-57, NC-58, NC-59, NC-60, NC-61, NC-62

Neighboring Townships: 
 Bruce
 Center Grove
 Deep River
 Fentress
 Friendship
 Gilmer, 
 Jamestown
 Monroe
 Sumner

Nearby Townships: 
 Abbotts Creek
 Abbotts Creek
 Belews Creek
 Clay
 High Point
 Jefferson
 Kernersville
 Level Cross
 Madison
 Oak Ridge

References

Townships in North Carolina